Twist (1994) is the third solo album by New Zealand singer-songwriter Dave Dobbyn, his first recorded in New Zealand after almost a decade living overseas. It was produced by Neil Finn and featured Finn and two members of The Mutton Birds on guitars, bass and drums, as well as contributions by Tim Finn, Don McGlashan and US record producer Tchad Blake. The album was released in the United States with a slightly altered track listing, and some tracks replaced by songs from his previous album. First single "Language" reached number four on the New Zealand charts.

Background
After the struggle to release his previous album Lament For The Numb, Dobbyn returned to New Zealand. Fellow New Zealand musician Neil Finn had also just returned to the country with the ending of Crowded House and was happy to have the opportunity to work on another artists' album. Dobbyn credits Finn for giving the album much of its sound.

Track listing

The US release featured an altered track list, and three songs from Dobbyn's previous album Lament for the Numb.{}

Personnel

Dave Dobbyn — vocals, guitars, piano, keyboards
Neil Finn — guitars, backing vocals, piano, optigan, keyboards
Alan Gregg — bass
Ross Burge — drums
 Tchad Blake — noise
 Tim Finn — backing vocal, percussion, drums ("Language")
 Don McGlashan — euphonium ("It Dawned On Me")
 Emma Paki — backing vocals ("Naked Flame")
 Robert Issell — violin
 Christine Bowie — viola
 Ashley Hopkins — bass clarinet
 Miguel Fuentes — percussion ("Naked Flame", "I Can't Change My Name")
 Nathan Haines — tenor sax ("P.C.")
 Liam Finn — backing vocals ("P.C.")
 Cameron Lindsay — backing vocals ("P.C.")
 Lindsay and Elroy Finn — backing vocals ("P.C.")

Critical reception
Reception was positive. In 2009, New Zealand rock journalist Graham Reid described Twist as "the album of Dobbyn's career."

References

External links
 1994 Nick Bollanger review of 'Twist',  NZ Listener
 1994 Chris Bourke interview with Dobbyn, NZ Listener
 Sydney Morning Herald interview

Dave Dobbyn albums
1994 albums